The Republic of Haiti from 1859 to 1957 was an era in Haitian history plagued with political struggles, the period of American occupation and multiple coups and elections until the Duvalier dynasty seized control of the country in 1957.

History

Building a republic and failure
Fabre Geffrard's government held office until 1867, and he encouraged a successful policy of national reconciliation. In 1860, he reached an agreement with the Vatican, reintroducing official Roman Catholic institutions, including schools, to the nation. In 1867 an attempt was made to establish a constitutional government, but successive presidents Sylvain Salnave and Nissage Saget were overthrown in 1869 and 1874 respectively. A more workable constitution was introduced under Michel Domingue in 1874, leading to a long period of democratic peace and development for Haiti. The debt to France was finally repaid in 1879, and Michel Domingue's government peacefully transferred power to Lysius Salomon, one of Haiti's abler leaders. Monetary reform and a cultural renaissance ensued with a flowering of Haitian art. The final two decades of the 19th century were also marked by the development of a Haitian intellectual culture. Major works of history were published in 1847 and 1865. Haitian intellectuals, led by Louis-Joseph Janvier and Anténor Firmin, engaged in a war of letters against a tide of racism and Social Darwinism that emerged during this period.

The Constitution of 1867 saw peaceful and progressive transitions in government that did much to improve the economy and stability of the Haitian nation and the condition of its people. Constitutional government restored the faith of the Haitian people in legal institutions. The development of industrial sugar and rum industries near Port-au-Prince made Haiti, for a while, a model for economic growth in Latin American countries.
This period of relative stability and prosperity ended in 1911, when revolution broke out and the country slid once again into disorder and debt.

From 1911 to 1915, there were six presidents, each of whom was killed or forced into exile. The revolutionary armies were formed by cacos, peasant brigands from the mountains of the north, along the porous Dominican border, who were enlisted by rival political factions with promises of money to be paid after a successful revolution and an opportunity to plunder. The United States was particularly apprehensive about the role of the German community in Haiti (approximately 200 in 1910), who wielded a disproportionate amount of economic power. Germans controlled about 80% of the country's international commerce; they also owned and operated utilities in Cap Haïtien and Port-au-Prince, the main wharf and a tramway in the capital, and a railroad serving the Plaine de Cul-du-Sac.

The German community proved more willing to integrate into Haitian society than any other group of white foreigners, including the French. A number married into the nation's most prominent mulatto families, bypassing the constitutional prohibition against foreign land-ownership. They also served as the principal financiers of the nation's innumerable revolutions, floating innumerable loans-at high interest rates-to competing political factions. In an effort to limit German influence, in 1910–11, the US State Department backed a consortium of American investors, assembled by the National City Bank of New York, in securing the currency issuance concession through the National Bank of the Republic of Haiti, which replaced the prior National Bank of Haiti as the nation's only commercial bank and custodian of the government treasury.

In December 1914, the U.S. military seized the Haitian government's gold reserve, urged on by the National City Bank and the National Bank of the Republic of Haiti (which was already under foreign direction). The U.S. took the gold to National City Bank's New York City vault.

In February 1915, Vilbrun Guillaume Sam formed a dictatorship, but in July, facing a new revolt, whom he massacred 167 political opponents, and was lynched by a mob in Port-au-Prince.

United States occupation

In 1915, Philippe Sudré Dartiguenave was appointed by US authorities to the Presidency of Haiti. Martial law was declared, and persisted until 1929. A treaty, which allowed the US government complete control over cabinet positions and Haiti's finances, was passed by the legislature in November 1915. The treaty also established the Gendarmerie d'Haïti (Haitian Constabulatory Force), Haiti's first professional military. Dartiguenave dissolved the legislature in 1917 after its members refused to approve a new constitution. A referendum subsequently approved the constitution, which allowed foreigners to own land, something which had been forbidden by Haitian law since independence in 1804.

The US occupation was a costly period in terms of human life. A revolt by disgruntled citizens was put down in 1918, with an estimated 2,000 killed. White foreigners, many with deep racial prejudices, dominated public policy, which angered the historically dominant Mulattos. However, Haiti's infrastructure, including roads, telephone lines, and plumbing, were repaired. Lighthouses, schools, hospitals, and harbors were built. Louis Borno replaced Dartiguenave as president in 1922, after he was forced out of office. He ruled without a legislature until elections were permitted in 1930. This newly formed legislature elected Sténio Vincent, a mulatto, as president.

By 1930, Haiti had become a liability to the United States. A congressional inquiry, known as the Forbes Commission, exposed many human rights violations, and while it praised improvements in Haitian society, it criticized the exclusion of Haitians from positions of authority. By August 1932, with the election of Franklin D. Roosevelt as US President, American troops withdrew and authority was formally transferred to local police and army officials.

Post-occupation, World War II and collapse
Vincent took advantage of the stability to gain dictatorial power. Vincent expanded his economic authority by referendum, and in 1935, he forced a new constitution through the legislature. This constitution gave him power to dissolve the legislature and reorganize the judiciary at will, as well as the power to appoint senators. He also brutally oppressed political opposition.

Rafael Leónidas Trujillo had come to power in 1930 in the neighboring Dominican Republic. In 1937, Trujillo attacked the border with Haiti, his forces killing an estimated 20,000 Haitians. This attack Vincent interpreted as an attempted coup against himself, and thus he purged the military of all officers suspected of disloyalty. Many of these later joined the Dominican military.

In 1941, Élie Lescot, a mulatto who was an experienced and competent government official, was elected as President. Despite high expectations, his tenure paralleled Vincent's in its brutality and marginalization of opposition. He declared war on the Axis powers during World War II, and used this as an excuse to censor the press and repress his opponents. Lescot also maintained a clandestine cooperation with Trujillo, which undermined his already-nonexistent popularity. In January 1946, after Lescot jailed editors of a Marxist newspaper, protests broke out among government workers, teachers, and business owners. Lescot resigned, and a military junta, the Comité Exécutif Militaire (Executive Military Committee), assumed power.

Haiti elected a legislature in May 1946, and after two rounds of voting, Dumarsais Estimé, a black cabinet minister, was elected president. He operated under a new constitution which expanded schools, established rural farming cooperatives, and raised salaries of civil servants. These early successes, however, were undermined by his personal ambition, and his alienation of the military and elite led to a coup in 1950, which reinstalled the military junta. Direct elections, the first in Haiti's history, were held in October 1950, and Paul Magloire, an elite black Colonel in the military, was elected. Hurricane Hazel hit the island in 1954, which devastated the nation's infrastructure and economy. Hurricane relief was inadequately distributed and misspent, and Magloire jailed opponents and shut down newspapers. After refusing to step down after his term ended, a general strike shut down Port-au-Prince's economy, and Magloire fled, leaving the government in a state of chaos. When elections were finally organized, François Duvalier, a rural doctor, was elected, on a platform of activism on behalf of Haiti's poor. His opponent, however, Louis Déjoie, was a mulatto and the scion of a prominent family. Duvalier scored a decisive victory at the polls. His followers took two-thirds of the legislature's lower house and all of the seats in the Senate.

See also
History of Haiti

References

 
History of Haiti by period
Republic of Haiti (1859–1957)
1859 in the Caribbean
1859 establishments in North America
1957 disestablishments in North America